Millî Piyango İdaresi (MPI, English: National Lottery Administration) is the Turkish national lottery body.

An attempt to privatise it was cancelled in 2008 after bidders failed to meet the government's $1.6bn valuation.

Milli Piyango has arranged some sports sponsorship, including of the Maliye Milli Piyango SK and Milli Piyango Curling Arena.

References

External links
 www.millipiyango.gov.tr

Lotteries
Gambling in Turkey